Ahmad Rahil Fourmoli (born 30 November 1971) is an Afghan football player. He has played for Afghanistan national team.

National team statistics

External links
 
 

1971 births
Living people
Afghan footballers
Footballers at the 2002 Asian Games
Association football defenders
Asian Games competitors for Afghanistan
Afghanistan international footballers